4th SLGFCA Awards
December 24, 2007

Best Film: 
No Country for Old Men

Best Directors: 
Ethan & Joel Coen
No Country for Old Men
The 4th St. Louis Gateway Film Critics Association Awards were given on December 24, 2007.

Winners and nominees

Best Actor
Daniel Day-Lewis - There Will Be Blood as Daniel Plainview
Don Cheadle – Talk to Me as Ralph "Petey" Greene
George Clooney – Michael Clayton as Michael Clayton
Ryan Gosling – Lars and the Real Girl as Lars Lindstrom
Tommy Lee Jones – In the Valley of Elah as Hank Deerfield
Viggo Mortensen – Eastern Promises as Nikolai Luzhin

Best Actress
Elliot Page - Juno as Juno MacGuff
Cate Blanchett – Elizabeth: The Golden Age as Elizabeth I
Julie Christie – Away from Her as Fiona Anderson
Marion Cotillard – La Vie en Rose as Édith Piaf
Jodie Foster – The Brave One as Erica Bain
Laura Linney – The Savages as Wendy Savage

Best Animated or Children's Film
Ratatouille
Bridge to Terabithia
Enchanted
The Golden Compass
Persepolis
The Simpsons Movie

Best Cinematography
The Assassination of Jesse James by the Coward Robert Ford - Roger DeakinsAtonement – Seamus McGarvey
The Diving Bell and the Butterfly (Le scaphandre et le papillon) – Janusz Kamiński
Into the Wild – Eric Gautier
The Kite Runner – Roberto Schaefer
No Country for Old Men – Roger Deakins
There Will Be Blood – Robert Elswit

Best DirectorEthan & Joel Coen - No Country for Old Men
Paul Thomas Anderson – There Will Be Blood
Tim Burton – Sweeney Todd
Mike Nichols – Charlie Wilson's War
Sean Penn – Into the Wild
Julian Schnabel – The Diving Bell and the Butterfly (Le scaphandre et le papillon)

Best Documentary FilmSicko
In the Shadow of the Moon
The King of Kong: A Fistful of Quarters
Manufactured Landscapes
No End in Sight

Best Film
No Country for Old Men
The Assassination of Jesse James by the Coward Robert Ford
The Diving Bell and the Butterfly (Le scaphandre et le papillon)
Into the Wild
Juno
The Kite Runner
Sweeney Todd
Atonement
Michael Clayton
There Will Be Blood

Best Film - Musical or Comedy
Juno
Knocked Up
Lars and the Real Girl
The Simpsons Movie
Superbad
Waitress
Walk Hard: The Dewey Cox Story

Best Foreign Language Film
The Diving Bell and the Butterfly (Le scaphandre et le papillon) • France/United States
The Host • South Korea
The Kite Runner • Afghanistan/United States
La Vie en Rose • France
Lust, Caution • China/Hong Kong/Taiwan
Persepolis • France

Best Score
Sweeney Todd - Stephen Sondheim
The Assassination of Jesse James by the Coward Robert Ford - Nick Cave & Warren Ellis
Atonement - Dario Marianelli
There Will Be Blood - Jonny Greenwood
Juno - Mateo Messina
La Vie en Rose - Christopher Gunning
Once - Glen Hansard & Markéta Irglová

Best Screenplay
Juno - Diablo CodyAtonement – Ian McEwan & Christopher Hampton
Into the Wild – Sean Penn & Jon Krakauer
Lars and the Real Girl – Nancy Oliver
Michael Clayton – Tony Gilroy
No Country for Old Men – Ethan & Joel Coen
Persepolis – Vincent Paronnaud & Marjane Satrapi

Best Supporting ActorCasey Affleck - The Assassination of Jesse James by the Coward Robert Ford as Robert Ford
Javier Bardem – No Country for Old Men as Anton Chigurh
Josh Brolin – No Country for Old Men as Llewelyn Moss
Philip Seymour Hoffman – Charlie Wilson's War as Gust Avrakotos
Tommy Lee Jones – No Country for Old Men as Ed Tom Bell
Michael Sheen – Music Within as Art Honeyman
Tom Wilkinson – Michael Clayton as Arthur Edens

Best Supporting ActressAmy Ryan - Gone Baby Gone as Helene McCready
Cate Blanchett – I'm Not There as Jude Quinn
Katherine Heigl – Knocked Up as Allison Scott
Taraji P. Henson – Talk to Me as Vernell Watson
Saoirse Ronan – Atonement as Briony Tallis (age 13)
Tilda Swinton – Michael Clayton as Karen Crowder

Best Visual/Special Effects300
The Golden Compass
Harry Potter and the Order of the Phoenix
I Am Legend
Stardust
Sweeney Todd

Most Original, Innovative or Creative Film
I'm Not There
Across the Universe
The Diving Bell and the Butterfly (Le scaphandre et le papillon)
Into Great Silence
Juno
Persepolis

Worst Film of the Year
The Brothers Solomon

Notes

References
IMDb - St. Louis Film Critics Association Awards

2007
2007 film awards
2007 in Missouri
St Louis